The 33rd Pennsylvania House of Representatives District is in southwest Pennsylvania and has been represented by Mandy Steele since 2023.

District profile
The 33rd District is located in Allegheny County and includes the following areas:

Aspinwall
Blawnox
 Brackenridge
 Cheswick
 East Deer Township
Fawn Township
Fox Chapel
 Frazer Township
 Harmar Township
 Harrison Township 
 Indiana Township
O'Hara Township
Sharpsburg
 Springdale
 Springdale Township
 Tarentum

Representatives

Recent election results

References

External links
District map from the United States Census Bureau
Pennsylvania House Legislative District Maps from the Pennsylvania Redistricting Commission.  
Population Data for District 33 from the Pennsylvania Redistricting Commission.

Government of Allegheny County, Pennsylvania
Government of Westmoreland County, Pennsylvania
33